Landiougou is a village in northern Ivory Coast. It is in the sub-prefecture of Kasséré, Boundiali Department, Bagoué Region, Savanes District.

Landiougou was a commune until March 2012, when it became one of 1126 communes nationwide that were abolished.

Notes

Former communes of Ivory Coast
Populated places in Savanes District
Populated places in Bagoué